Nacopa is a genus of moths of the family Noctuidae erected by William Barnes and Foster Hendrickson Benjamin in 1924.

Species
 Nacopa bistrigata (Barnes & McDunnough, 1918)
 Nacopa melanderi Barnes & Benjamin, 1927

References

Amphipyrinae
Moth genera